Doniphan is an unincorporated community in Doniphan County, Kansas, United States.

History
The company that founded the community was organized on November 11, 1854. Doniphan was incorporated in 1869. The community was named for Alexander William Doniphan, a military leader in the Mexican–American War.

A post office was opened in Doniphan on March 3, 1855, and remained in operation until it was discontinued on August 15, 1943.

Demographics
Doniphan is part of the St. Joseph, MO–KS Metropolitan Statistical Area.

References

Further reading

External links
 Doniphan County maps: Current, Historic, KDOT

Unincorporated communities in Doniphan County, Kansas
Unincorporated communities in Kansas
St. Joseph, Missouri metropolitan area
1854 establishments in Kansas Territory